Vincent Pieter Semeyn Esser known as Piet Esser (9 March 1914, Baarn – 19 November 2004) was a Dutch sculptor.

Biography 
Esser was part of the Dutch "Groep van de figuratieve abstractie" (Figurative abstraction group). He won a silver medal at the Prix de Rome in 1938, and became a professor at the Rijksakademie, Amsterdam in 1947.

Selected works 
 Troelstramonument (monument to Pieter Jelles Troelstra) in The Hague (1953)
 Watersnood 1953 (North Sea flood of 1953) in sculpture garden of Museum Boijmans Van Beuningen, Rotterdam (1957)
 Brederomonument  (monument to Gerbrand Adriaensz Bredero) in Amsterdam (1968)
 Icarus in The Hague (1974)
 Barmhartige Samaritaan (Good Samaritan) in Utrecht (1976)
 Statue of Cornelis Lely in Lelystad (1984, erected 2002 but removed at sculptor's request in 2003)

See also 
 Piet Esser in Dutch Wikipedia
 Groep van de figuratieve abstractie in Dutch Wikipedia

References 

1914 births
2004 deaths
Dutch male sculptors
Modern sculptors
People from Baarn
20th-century Dutch sculptors
20th-century Dutch male artists